Papilionovela is a genus of fungi in the family Hyponectriaceae. This is a monotypic genus, containing the single species Papilionovela albothallina.

References

External links
Index Fungorum

Xylariales
Monotypic Ascomycota genera
Taxa named by André Aptroot